Nierembergia linariifolia, called the narrow-leaved cupflower, is a species of plant described by Robert Graham. Nierembergia linariifolia is part of the genus Nierembergia and the family Solanaceae. It has gained the Royal Horticultural Society's Award of Garden Merit.

Range
It is native to central South America, and has been introduced to New South Wales, Australia.

Subspecies
The following subspecies are accepted:

Nierembergia linariifolia subsp. glabriuscula (Dunal) A.A.Cocucci & Hunz.
Nierembergia linariifolia subsp. linariifolia
Nierembergia linariifolia subsp. pampeana (Millán) A.A.Cocucci & Hunz.
Nierembergia linariifolia subsp. pinifolioides (Millán) A.A.Cocucci & Hunz.

References

Petunioideae
Plants described in 1831